Steve Marker (born March 16, 1959) is an American musician, songwriter, and record producer, best known as a cofounder and guitarist of the alternative rock band Garbage.

Early life

Steven W. Marker was born in Mamaroneck, New York on March 16, 1959. He spent most of his childhood and his teens in Mamaroneck, New York. At the age of 6, his parents bought him drums, but at 12 he took up the guitar. He graduated from Rye Neck High School in Mamaroneck.

Marker attended the University of Wisconsin in Madison for a degree in film. There, he met Butch Vig who played with the band Spooner. In 1979 the group was trying to figure out how to record a 7-inch single and Marker had grown an interest in musical producing, he bought a four-track reel-to-reel deck, which complemented by Vig's microphones became a home studio in Marker's basement. Marker and Vig also started a small label, Boat Records, to release records of both Spooner and other bands they liked.

Career

Marker co-founded Madison's Smart Studios with Butch Vig in 1983, and maintained a production career engineering and mixing records until he formed Garbage with Vig and Vig's bandmate in Spooner, Duke Erikson, in 1994. He famously spotted Angelfish singer Shirley Manson's music video on MTV's 120 Minutes, which led to her joining the group. Marker felt that Manson differed from the high pitched and screechy female singers of the 1990s and "was more like the voices that we loved growing up, which was more Patti Smith and Chrissie Hynde – sort of that classic pop sound – maybe Dusty Springfield."

Marker stated that his musical style is not influenced by "the guys that played twenty minute solos", stating he always preferred "guitar parts that sort of work melodically more in a Beatles sense," with artists such as Tom Petty, Keith Richards, The Pretenders and Robert Fripp. Marker considered that his background as a producer helped develop a type of playing where "you're not there to show off, to show how brilliant you are or draw attention to yourself. You're there to make the song work in whatever way is necessary," stating that the guitar "is there to serve the song".

Personal life

Marker is married, and has a daughter named Ruby (born March 2000). After living for 25 years in Madison, following Garbage's hiatus in 2005, Marker relocated to Carbondale, Colorado with his family.

Discography

Garbage

Studio albums
Garbage (1995)
Version 2.0 (1998)
Beautiful Garbage (2001)
Bleed Like Me (2005)
Not Your Kind of People (2012)
Strange Little Birds (2016)
No Gods No Masters (2021)

Compilation albums and EPs
Special Collection (2002)
Absolute Garbage (2007)

Production career

Steve Marker served as the record producer, or co-producer on the following records:

1984: Killdozer – Intellectuals Are the Shoeshine Boys of the Ruling Elite
1985: Killdozer – Snakeboy
1992: Gumball – Wisconsin Hayride
1993: The Heart Throbs – Vertical Smile
1995: Garbage – Garbage
1998: Garbage – Version 2.0
2001: Garbage – Beautiful Garbage
2005: Garbage – Bleed Like Me
2012: Garbage – Not Your Kind of People
2016: Garbage – Strange Little Birds'''
2021: Garbage – No Gods No Masters

He also engineered the following records:

1987: Tar Babies – Fried Milk1989: Killdozer – Twelve Point Buck1990: Poopshovel – I Came, I Saw, I Had A Hotdog1992: L7 – Bricks Are Heavy''

References

External links

Official Website Garbage

Record producers from New York (state)
American rock guitarists
American male guitarists
Garbage (band) members
Living people
1959 births
People from Mamaroneck, New York
20th-century American guitarists

de:Garbage#Mitglieder